Anthene africana is a butterfly in the family Lycaenidae. It is found in Nigeria and Cameroon.

References

Butterflies described in 1926
Anthene